Bricklehampton is a village and civil parish in Worcestershire, England. In the 2011 census the population of the parish was recorded as 220. The village shares a parish council with Elmley Castle and Netherton.

History

The name at the time of the Domesday Book in 1086 was Bricstelmenstune.

Bricklehampton's parish church, dedicated to St Michael and All Angels, is a grade II listed building. The medieval church was rebuilt and restored in 1875-1877 but the 12th-century font and south doorway remain.  there are 12 listed buildings in the parish, all at grade II, including the 1848 mansion Bricklehampton Hall, now a nursing home, and a K6 telephone box.

Longest one word place name in English
According to linguist David Crystal, the 14-letter town name is perhaps the longest one-word place name in the English-speaking world that does not repeat any letter. Two places named Buslingthorpe (one in Leeds and in one in Lincolnshire) and Buckfastleigh in Devon had previously been thought to share this honour, with 13 unique letters.

References

Villages in Worcestershire
Civil parishes in Worcestershire